Rembrandt   is a 1940 Dutch film directed by Gerard Rutten. It portrays the life of the Dutch artist Rembrandt (1606-1669). He had previously been played by Charles Laughton in the 1936 film Rembrandt. A 1942 German film was also made, starring Ewald Balser.

Cast
Anny de Lange		
Guus Verstraete		
Jules Verstraete

External links 
 

←

1940 films
Dutch black-and-white films
Films about Rembrandt
1940s historical drama films
1940s Dutch-language films
Dutch historical drama films
Films set in the 1640s
Films set in the 1650s
Films set in the 1660s
Dutch biographical drama films
Films directed by Gerard Rutten
1940s biographical drama films
1940 drama films